The Krylatskoye Sports Complex Archery Field is a sports venue located in Moscow, Russia. Located near the Canoeing and Rowing Basin, it hosted the archery competitions for the 1980 Summer Olympics.

References
1980 Summer Olympics official report. Volume 2. Part 1. pp. 95–6.

Venues of the 1980 Summer Olympics
Olympic archery venues
Sports venues built in the Soviet Union
Sports venues in Russia